Shania Twain is the debut studio album by Canadian singer Shania Twain, released on April 20, 1993, by Polygram and Mercury Records. The album was a worldwide commercial failure when first released, but following the significant success of Twain's three subsequent albums, an interest in Shania Twain developed, leading it to be certified Platinum in 1999 by the RIAA for shipments of over one million copies. To promote the album, the singles, "What Made You Say That", "Dance with the One That Brought You" and "You Lay a Whole Lot of Love on Me", were released as singles and accompanied by music videos.

Five songs were originally recorded by other artists. "There Goes the Neighborhood" was recorded by Joe Diffie in 1990, "When He Leaves You" was a single for Donna Meade in 1989, "You Lay a Whole Lot of Love on Me" was recorded by Con Hunley in 1980 and Tom Jones in 1983, "Still Under the Weather" was recorded by Andy Williams in 1990, and "What Made You Say That" was recorded by Wayne Massey in 1989. In her 2011 autobiography, From This Moment On, Twain expressed displeasure with her debut studio album, revealing that she had very little creative control and was frustrated with being unable to showcase her songwriting abilities. However, she did co-write one song on the album titled "God Ain't Gonna Getcha for That".

After her subsequent albums The Woman in Me (1995) and especially Come On Over (1997) catapulted her to superstardom, Twain essentially disowned this album and has not performed any material from it live following the conclusion of her Come on Over Tour in 1999. Even during the aforementioned tour only the song "What Made You Say That" was included from the album in her setlist despite her only having three albums of material at the time to draw from. In addition, no selections from it were included on her 2004 Greatest Hits album. "What Made You Say That" is included on her Netflix documentary companion compilation album Not Just a Girl (The Highlights) released on July 26, 2022.

Track listing

Music videos
 "What Made You Say That"
 "Dance with the One That Brought You"
 "You Lay a Whole Lot of Love on Me"

Personnel
Shania Twain - lead vocals
Paul Leim, Larrie Londin - drums
Terry McMillan - percussion
Mike Brignardello, Glenn Worf - bass
Mark Casstevens, Allen Frank Estes, Chris Leuzinger, Billy Joe Walker Jr., John Willis - acoustic guitar
Steve Gibson, Billy Joe Walker Jr., Reggie Young - electric guitar
Sonny Garrish - steel guitar
Costo Davis - synthesizer
David Briggs, Costo Davis, Gary Prim - keyboards
Terry McMillan, Kirk "Jelly Roll" Johnson - harmonica 
Anthony Martin, John Wesley Ryles, Ronny Scaife, Shania Twain, Cindy Richardson Walker, Dennis Wilson, Curtis Young - backing vocals
Technical
Produced by Norro Wilson and Harold Shedd
Engineered and mixed by Jim Cotton, Todd Culross, Graeme Smith and Joe Scaife
Mastered by Marty Williams

Charts

Weekly charts

Year-end charts

Certifications

Release history

References

1993 debut albums
Shania Twain albums
Mercury Records albums
Albums produced by Norro Wilson
Albums produced by Harold Shedd